David Baron is a composer, producer, arranger, recording engineer and keyboardist from Boiceville, New York.

Career
Baron holds a BA degree from the Oberlin Conservatory of Music in Oberlin, Ohio.

Between 1991 and 2000, David ran Baron and Baron with his father, Aaron Baron. Aaron Baron was a pioneer in location recording and engineered many famous records including, Allman Brother’s at Fillmore East “BB King Live in Cook County Jail”. Baron and Baron became a leader in original music for television network branding. During this period David composed and produced music for E!, fX, VH1, MGM, Star TV, PBS, ABC, CBS, Showtime, TV Land, Nickelodeon, MTV, and others.

After Baron and Baron folded, David formed Edison Music in 2001 and took over the Hotel Edison recording studio with Lenny Kravitz and Henry Hirsch. The trio ran the studio from 2001 to 2008. David made a foray into records during this period, first with Lenny Kravitz and later producing, playing, and composing for many records.

In 2008, he opened his own studio in Boiceville, called Sun Mountain Studios; the studio includes a vast instrument collection. Baron, an aficionado of rare analog synthesizers, owns analog modular synthesizers, including the Arp 2500, Moog Modular 3p, and a large Serge Modular System.

Notable works

Film/Art (recent)
Gregory Colbert/Ashes and Snow – unannounced film, art and technological installation project. Follow up to Ashes and Snow. Multiple long-form films (score), 24-hour song cycle (songwriter and chief producer), and short VR films.  Announcement 2018.
Tatterdemalion Green Hummingbird - David was responsible for the orchestral feature film score, release date TBD.  Premiered October 2017 at Heartland Film Festival.
Keely and Du Dykon Films. David did the feature film score (all electronic). In production (2018)
The Lumineers "Ballad of Cleopatra" David created the underscore for the short film. (2017)
Francis VR David created the musical score for VR film for the World Bank/World Health Organization to raise awareness for mental health. Shown at the First World Humanitarian Summit in Turkey, the UN, World Bank conference, and Sundance Film Festival. (2017)

Records
Diana DeMuth “Hotel”. David was Producer, Engineer, Mixer, Keyboards, Programmer. 

Matt Maeson, "Hallucinogenics," "The Hearse". David was producer, engineer, arranger, keyboards. Atlantic Records. (2018)

Noah Kahan “Carlo's Song”. David was producer, engineer, and did keyboards, programming, piano.

Jade Bird “Jade Bird”. David was producer, engineer, mixer, keyboards, piano, string arrangements. 

Josin “Evaporation New York Recordings” Producer, Engineer, Mixer. 

Molly Tuttle When You're Ready. Noise, synthesizer. 

Bat for Lashes “The Bride (album)” 2016. David was responsible for synthesizers, string arrangements, mixing. EMI Records. Nominated for the 2016 Mercury Prize Award

The Lumineers, “” Engineer, David's credits include: Mixer, Keyboards, Arranger. 

“The Lumineers Cleopatra” David played keyboards. Dualtone Records. #1 Billboard Record (2016)

The Lumineers “Nightshade - Game of Thrones"”. David was Mixer. 

“Cycles,” David Baron. Here & Now Recordings, UK – debut solo record. Instrumental music featuring rare analog Modular synthesizers, string sections and grand pianos recorded in a concert hall, hyper-processed acoustic instruments, and advanced Kyma-based sound design.

“Something American EP”, "Lottery” Jade Bird.  David was producer, engineer, mixer (except for "Lottery"), arranger, musician (2017-2018)

“The Projector”, Simone Felice. David was responsible for keyboards, engineering, arranger, additional production, mixing (2018)

Lenny Kravitz, "Raise Vibration". David was responsible for piano, keyboards, synthesizers, orchestral arrangements, orchestral production BMG. (2018)

Vance Joy, "Nation of Two," "Little Boy". David was responsible for keyboards, bass, arrangement, recording. (2018)

Shawn Mendes, "Shawn Mendes," "Perfectly Wrong" David was responsible for string arrangement, conductor, Island Records (2018)

Shawn Mendes, "Bad Reputation" David was responsible for string arrangement, conductor, Island Records,  #1 Billboard Record (2016).

Nick Fradiani "Howl at the Moon” David played keyboards. Big Machine Records

Melanie De Biasio “Blackened Cities” 2016. David was responsible for mix engineering and mastering. PIAS Recordings.

“Meghan Trainor, Title (Meghan Trainor album). EP and Record. David was a musician, arranger and conductor. Epic Records. Multi-platinum, Number One Record, Grammy Song of the Year Nominee (2015)

Simi Stone “Simi Stone”. David was producer, co-writer, and mixer.

Simone Felice "The Stranger". Producer and co-writer. (2014)

Burnell Pines “Burnell Pines”. David was producer, co-writer, and arranger.

“Lenny”, “Black and White America”, “Strut” Lenny Kravitz. David appears as string arranger, synthesist, and keyboardist.

Peter Murphy (musician), “Ninth”. David was Producer, Composer, Cowriter and Musician. Nettwerk

“Another Day” Michael Jackson. David appears on synths and programming.

"Age of Solo", "Everyman", and "Good Weather, Bad Fortune"  “Lettie”  Producer and co-writer.

"Simi" and "Good Friend EP"  Simi Stone aka “Simi Sernaker”.  Producer and co-writer.

Commercials and network branding
TV Land Branding 2000-2008
OWN Network Launch
Old Navy “Drawstring” jingle
Target “Love & Efficiency” song
JCPenney “It’s All Inside” jingle and tag
PBS Kids theme (co-composed with David Wilson)

Current projects
Unannounced Project with Gregory Colbert.
Production with Simone Felice
Production with Kevin Kadish

References

21st-century American composers
Musicians from New York (state)
People from Ulster County, New York
Living people
Year of birth missing (living people)